Titouan Lamazou is a French navigator, artist and writer, born on July 11, 1955 in Casablanca, Morocco. He was actually born Antoine Lamazou, he officially took the name Titouan Lamazou in 1986. After a stint at the Fine Arts, he went travelling at the age of 18 where he met with Eric Tabarly who encouraged him into adventure sailing winning the first Vendée Globe in 1991.

Distinctions
 1990 - André de Saint-Sauveur Prize from the French Academy of Sports
 1991 - Chevalier de l'ordre du Mérite Maritime Knight of the Order of Maritime Merit 1991
 2003 = Official Navy Painter in 2003
 2003 = UNESCO Artist for Peace, 2003
 2017 - Chevalier de la Légion d'honneur Knight of the Legion of Honour on April 14, 2017

Reference

External links
 

1955 births
Living people
Sportspeople from Casablanca
French male sailors (sport)
People from Morlaix

Recipients of the Legion of Honour

IMOCA 60 class sailors
French Vendee Globe sailors
1989 Vendee Globe sailors
Vendée Globe finishers